Passandrella is a genus of beetles in the family Passandridae.

Species
 Passandrella tuberculata Burckhardt & Slipinski
 Passandrella visenda Grouvelle, 1916

References

Passandridae